is a passenger railway station located in the city of Misato, Saitama, Japan, operated by East Japan Railway Company (JR East).

Lines
It is located 51.3 kilometers from Fuchūhommachi Station and 80.1 kilometers from the official starting point of the line (for freight operations) at Tsurumi Station.

Station layout

The station consists of two opposed side platforms serving two tracks, connected by a footbridge. The station is staffed.

Platforms

History
The station opened on 14 March 1985.

Passenger statistics
In fiscal 2019, the station was used by an average of 15,502 passengers daily (boarding passengers only).

The passenger figures (boarding passengers only) for previous years are as shown below.

Surrounding area

Shim-Misato Station was formerly adjacent to the Musashino Marshalling Yard. However, this closed in 1986, and the land was redeveloped.
 IKEA Shin-Misato
 Costco Shin-Misato
 Lalaport Shin-Misato shopping mall (since September 2009)

See also
 List of railway stations in Japan

References

External links

 Shim-Misato Station information (JR East) 
 Shim-Misato Station information (Saitama Prefectural Government) 

Railway stations in Japan opened in 1985
Stations of East Japan Railway Company
Railway stations in Saitama Prefecture
Musashino Line
Misato, Saitama (city)